Capdenac-Gare is a commune in the Aveyron department in southern France. The old village of Capdenac is directly west of Capdenac-Gare, across the river Lot. In the southern outskirts of Capdenac-Gare is the area of Massip.

As the name suggests, Capdenac-Gare is the home to the railway station serving Capdenac.

Population

See also
Communes of the Aveyron department

References

Communes of Aveyron
Aveyron communes articles needing translation from French Wikipedia